The Creative Kids Museum, a part of TELUS Spark located in Calgary, Alberta, Canada. The Children's museum, which opened in October 2011, focuses on hands-on explorations of music, theater and visual arts and is Canada's first hands-on museum dedicated exclusively to the arts.

Affiliations
The Museum is affiliated with: CMA, CHIN, and Virtual Museum of Canada.

External links
 

Children's museums in Canada
Museums in Calgary
Museums established in 2006